Nai Harvest was a British emo band from Sheffield, United Kingdom.

History
Nai Harvest began in 2011. The band released their debut full-length album in 2013 titled Whatever on Dog Knights Productions and Pinky Swear Records. The band does not view Whatever as an album, rather a collection of early songs. In 2015, Nai Harvest released their second full-length album titled Hairball on Topshelf Records.

The band has also released numerous EPs and splits, such as Feeling Better, a split with Bonjour, Invalids, and Reno Dakota, a split with Playlounge, an EP titled Hold Open My Head and A/B side singles titled Just Like You/Jelly.

In July 2016, Nai Harvest announced they were breaking up.

Band members
Ben Thompson (vocals, guitar)
Lew Currie (drums)

References

Musicians from Sheffield
British emo musical groups
Musical groups established in 2011
2011 establishments in England
Topshelf Records artists